Bob and Mike Bryan were the defending champions, but lost in the semifinals to Pierre-Hugues Herbert and Nicolas Mahut.

Herbert and Mahut went on to win the title, defeating Ivan Dodig and Marcel Granollers in the final, 4–6, 6–4, [10–3].

Seeds
All seeds receive a bye into the second round.

Draw

Finals

Top half

Bottom half

References
 Main Draw

Men's Doubles